The 1997 Russian Figure Skating Championships took place in Moscow from December 26 to 29, 1996. Skaters competed in the disciplines of men's singles, ladies' singles, pair skating, and ice dancing. The results were one of the criteria used to pick the Russian teams to the 1997 World Championships and the 1997 European Championships.

Senior results

Men

Ladies

Pairs

Ice dancing

External links
 results

1996 in figure skating
Russian Figure Skating Championships, 1997
Figure skating
Russian Figure Skating Championships
December 1996 sports events in Russia